Gorch Fock may refer to:

 Gorch Fock (author), pseudonym of Johann Wilhelm Kinau (1880-1916), German author 
 Gorch Fock (1933), the first sailing ship named after him
 Gorch Fock (1958), that ship's successor